Alpha Iota Delta is a scholastic honor society recognizing academic achievement among students in the fields of Decision Sciences and Information Systems.

The society was founded at Decision Sciences Institute in 1971, and admitted to the Association of College Honor Societies in 2009.

Alpha Iota Delta honor society has 55 active chapters across the United States, and a total membership of around 7000.

See also

 Association of College Honor Societies

External links

 
 ACHS Alpha Iota Delta entry

Association of College Honor Societies
Honor societies
Student organizations established in 1971
1971 establishments in the United States